Reginald Athelstane Arnold  (9 October 1924 – 23 July 2017) was an Australian racing cyclist.

Arnold's cycling career began in 1941, when his brothers gave him a bicycle for his birthday. Despite being blind in one eye, Arnold joined Ashfield cycling club in Sydney where he made a name for himself as a capable track sprinter, winning several state titles.

After World War II, Arnold competed on the European cycling circuit, and won numerous road and track races there as well as in America and Australia between 1946 and 1963. In 1952 and 1957, he was a member of the team which won the European madison championships (the de facto world title). He specialised in six-day racing and competed in 103 six-day events around the world.

In 2000, Arnold was awarded the Australian Sports Medal (ASM) for being part of the world number one team for day cycle races for a number of years. In the 2012 Queen's Birthday Honours, he was awarded the Medal of the Order of Australia for services to cycling.

Arnold died on 23 July 2017, aged 92, in Nerang, Queensland.

References

1924 births
2017 deaths
Recipients of the Medal of the Order of Australia
Recipients of the Australian Sports Medal
Cyclists from New South Wales